Caspian Oil and Gas Exhibition and Conference the largest energy event in the Caspian Region and it is the first specialised trade exhibition in Azerbaijan since the independence of the country. The first time it was held in 1994, 24-27 May, Baku, Azerbaijan.
The high profile of Caspian Oil & Gas is emphasised by participation in its opening ceremony from the President of Azerbaijan, Ilham Aliyev. Among the national leaders to send welcome letters for the opening of the exhibition each year are the Prime Ministers of the UK, Turkey and Norway, and the Presidents of the USA, France, Georgia, and the European Union. The Ministry of Energy of the Republic of Azerbaijan and SOCAR, the State Oil Company of the Republic of Azerbaijan, also make an invaluable contribution to the development of the exhibition.

The event counts leading global oil, gas and energy companies such as BP, OMV, Conoco Phillips, Statoil, Total, Petkim, TPAO and RWE among its exhibitors and sponsors. It offers Azerbaijan’s oil and gas companies a wide range of opportunities to work with international companies and introduce new technologies to domestic production and hydrocarbon extraction.
Each year, the exhibition is attended by more than 10,000 local and international professionals. Anniversary 25th Caspian Oil and Gas Exhibition and Conference 2018 will take place from May 29 to June 1. 
.It is organized by Iteca Caspian LLC and ITE Group plc.

References 

Energy conferences
Oil and gas companies of Azerbaijan